This is a list of plum cultigens.

Table of plums

References

List of plum cultigens
Plums